Archery (Spanish: Tiro con Arco), for the 2013 Bolivarian Games, started on 25 November and ended on 29 November 2013.

Medal table

Medal summary

Men

Women

Mixed

References

Events at the 2013 Bolivarian Games
2013 in archery
2013 Bolivarian Games